A double referendum was held in Liechtenstein on 2 March 1919. Voters were asked whether they approved of increasing the number of directly elected members of the Landtag from 12 to 17, and whether the voting age should be lowered from 24 to 21. Both proposals were rejected by 54.8% of voters.

Results

Increasing the number of members of the Landtag

Lowering the voting age

References

Liechtenstein referendum
Referendum
Referendums in Liechtenstein
Suffrage referendums
Liechtenstein referendum